Resistance Committee may refer to:
Dictatorship Resistance Committee, a Ukrainian electoral alliance formed in 2011
Popular Resistance Committees, a Palestinian militant group active in Gaza
Popular Resistance Committees (Yemen), pro-Hadi armed groups that have fought in the Yemeni Civil War
Price Increase and Famine Resistance Committee, a mass movement in West Bengal during the 1959 famine
Sudanese resistance committees, a grassroots network that partook in the Sudanese Revolution